Cytohesin-interacting protein is a protein that in humans is encoded by the CYTIP gene.

The protein encoded by this gene contains 2 leucine zipper domains and a putative C-terminal nuclear targeting signal, and it does not have any hydrophobic regions. This protein is expressed weakly in resting NK and T cells.

References

Further reading